Erick Gabriel Iragua Parraga (born 30 November 1995), commonly known as Erick Iragua, is a Bolivian footballer who plays for Guabirá as a midfielder.

Club career
On 30 June 2015, after suffering top division relegation with Universitario de Pando, Iragua signed a two-year deal with Portuguese club União da Madeira.

International career
He was part of the Bolivia national under-20 football team, who played the 2015 South American Youth Championship in Uruguay. He scored one goal in the competition on 15 January 2015, in a 2–4 defeat against Paraguay.

References

External links

1995 births
Living people
Sportspeople from Santa Cruz de la Sierra
Bolivian footballers
Association football midfielders
Primeira Liga players
Club Bolívar players
C.F. União players
Oriente Petrolero players
Club San José players
Guabirá players
Bolivian Primera División players
2015 South American Youth Football Championship players
Bolivian expatriate footballers
Expatriate footballers in Portugal
Bolivian expatriate sportspeople in Portugal
Bolivia youth international footballers